Guinean Portuguese is the variety of Portuguese spoken in Guinea-Bissau, where it is the official language.

Prevalence
Guinea-Bissau is unique among the African member states of the Community of Portuguese Language Countries (CPLP) in that it is both highly diverse linguistically, like Angola and Mozambique, and it is also a creole society, like Cape Verde and São Tomé e Príncipe. 

Rather than Portuguese, it is Guinea-Bissau Creole which serves as the lingua franca and the vehicle of national identity spoken as both a first and second language. Guinea-Bissau Creole is the dominant language of trade, informal literature and entertainment; Standard Portuguese is the official language of the country, which is exclusively used in news media, parliament, public services and educational programming. Thus Portuguese, for those who speak it, is often a third language. The native Portuguese speakers in Guinea-Bissau are mostly white Guineans. The reduction of native Portuguese speakers is caused by leave of most white Guineans to Portugal or Brazil and by civil war that affected education. The majority of the approximately 15% of Guineans who speak Portuguese are concentrated in an area of the capital city, Bissau, known as 'a Praça'. The variety of Guinea Bissau Creole spoken in the capital, Kriol di Bissau, is known for being more Lusitanized, borrowing words more freely from Portuguese.

The standard phonology is European Portuguese. But for second- and third-language speakers, it is affected by phonologies of native languages and resembles Indian Portuguese.

History
Portuguese was used as a communication between Portuguese settlers and different black tribes (most are Fulas, Mandingos, Manjacos, and Balante) before the nation became a permanent Portuguese overseas territory. The number of Portuguese speakers was large during Portuguese rule, although mestiços and most blacks speak a Portuguese Creole called Guinea-Bissau Creole, which is a more widely spoken lingua franca of the nation. After independence, when most Portuguese left, Portuguese speakers were reduced to less than 10% because of civil war that affected education, although it remained the official language of the country.

Phonology
At the phonetic-phonological level of the Portuguese spoken in Guinea-Bissau, for example, there are a series of trends to be
scored:

The neutralization of the distinction between coronal vibrating consonants; so when
a Guinean says 'caro' we get the impression that the 'r' vibrates more than it should;
when we hear 'car' it seems to vibrate less than it would elsewhere”

Neutralization of height between middle vowels and, therefore, “if [Guineans]
say 'he' (pronoun), it seems that you hear 'he' (letter name), and vice versa”

The propensity to fully realize the nasal consonant in syllabic coda position, or
i.e., “nasal vowels tend to turn V + nasal consonant, as in [kanta], instead of
from [kãta]”

The final 'l' seems weaker than in Portugal, even giving the impression of
that there is a minimal pause between the preceding vowel and it, as in 'Senegal', which comes out
like [seneˈga-l]”

The divergent sentence rhythm of European Portuguese and Brazilian Portuguese which, according to
authors, highlights the rhythm of Creole.

Language Planning
When the CPLP was founded in 1996, it helped Guinea-Bissau in education aside from peace talks there. Many Portuguese, Brazilian, and PALOP (mostly Angolan) teachers entered to increase Portuguese fluency among Bissau-Guineans. In 2005, in order to increase Portuguese fluency, there was an agreement between Guinean officials and Instituto Camões, which already had a center in Bissau, to open centers in other towns of the country: Canchungo, Ongoré, Mansôa, Bafatá, Gabú, Buba, Catió, Bolama, Bubaque, and Quinhamel. The percentage of Portuguese speakers increased to 14%.

See also
Guinea-Bissau Creole
RTP África
Mozambican Portuguese
ECOWAS

References

External links
 Cátedra "Português Língua Segunda e Estrangeira" — Bibliografia sobre o Português de Guiné Bissau . Cátedra de Português Língua Segunda e Estrangeira. — Bibliography on Guinean Portuguese
 O Português na África – Guiné-Bissau 

Portuguese dialects
Portuguese language in Africa